The Aptos Open is a defunct tennis tournament that was played on the Grand Prix tennis circuit in 1973. The event was held in Aptos, California and was played on outdoor hard courts.  Jeff Austin won the singles title while Jeff Austin and Fred McNair partnered to win the doubles title.

Past finals

Singles

Doubles

References
 Singles Draw
 Doubles Draw

Grand Prix tennis circuit
Hard court tennis tournaments
Defunct tennis tournaments in the United States
ATP Tour
1973 establishments in California
1973 disestablishments in California
Tennis in California